Tricholaelaps is a genus of mites in the family Laelapidae.

Species
 Tricholaelaps comatus Vitzthum, 1926     
 Tricholaelaps typhlomydis Gu & Shen, 1981

References

Laelapidae